Fianna Fáil (meaning 'Soldiers of Destiny' or 'Warriors of Fál'), officially Fianna Fáil – The Republican Party, is a conservative and Christian-democratic political party registered in both the Republic of Ireland and Northern Ireland.

The party was founded as a republican party on 16 May 1926 by Éamon de Valera and his supporters after they split from Sinn Féin. De Valera and his followers were determined to take seats in the Oireachtas while Sinn Féin's policy was to refuse to recognise it. Since 1927, Fianna Fáil has been one of Ireland's two major parties, along with Fine Gael since 1933; both are seen as centre-right parties, to the right of the Labour Party and Sinn Féin. The party dominated Irish political life for most of the 20th century, and, since its foundation, either it or Fine Gael has led every government. Between 1932 and 2011, it was the largest party in Dáil Éireann, but latterly with a decline in its vote share; from 1989 onwards, its periods of government were in coalition with parties of either the left or the right.

Fianna Fáil's vote collapsed in the 2011 general election; it emerged in third place, in what was widely seen as a political realignment in the wake of the post-2008 Irish economic downturn. By 2016, it had recovered enough to become the largest opposition party, and it entered a confidence and supply arrangement with a Fine Gael–led minority government. In 2020, after a number of months of political stalemate following the general election, Fianna Fáil agreed with Fine Gael and the Green Party to enter into an unprecedented coalition, with the leaders of Fianna Fáil and Fine Gael rotating between the roles of Taoiseach and Tánaiste.

Fianna Fáil is a member of the Alliance of Liberals and Democrats for Europe and of Liberal International. From February 2019 to September 2022, Fianna Fáil was in partnership with the Social Democratic and Labour Party in Northern Ireland.

History

 

Fianna Fáil was founded by Éamon de Valera, a former leader of Sinn Féin. He and a number of other members split from Sinn Féin when a motion he proposed—which called for elected members to be allowed to take their seats in Dáil Éireann if and when the controversial Oath of Allegiance was removed—failed to pass at the Sinn Féin Ard Fheis in 1926. His new party adopted its name on 2 April of the same year. While it was also opposed to the Treaty settlement, it rejected abstentionism, instead aiming to republicanise the Irish Free State from within. Fianna Fáil's platform of economic autarky had appeal among the farmers, working-class people and the poor, while alienating more affluent classes. It largely pre-empted voters of the aforementioned groups from the Labour Party (with its almost identical economic and social policy) following its entry into the Dáil in 1927. Fianna Fáil would go on to style themselves for several decades as "the real Labour Party."

Cumann na nGaedheal sought to exploit the notion that Fianna Fáil was a party in thrall to communists. During the 1932 general election campaign, Cumann na Gaedheal declared in a newspaper advert that "the gunmen and Communists are voting for Fianna Fáil today – vote for the Government party." However, Fianna Fáil won the election. The party first entered government on 9 March 1932. It was in power for 61 of the 79 years between then and the election of 2011. Its longest continuous period in office has been 15 years and 11 months (March 1932 – February 1948). Its longest single period out of office in the 20th century was four years and four months (March 1973 – July 1977). All of the party's leaders have served as Taoiseach.

The party's most dominant era was the 41-year period between 1932 and 1973, when party leaders Éamon de Valera, Seán Lemass and Jack Lynch served as Taoiseach in an almost unbroken chain save for six years that John A. Costello of Fine Gael briefly interrupted. De Valera's reign is acknowledged for having successfully guided Ireland through World War II unscathed but is criticised for leaving Ireland in economic and cultural stagnation. His successors such as Lemass however were able to turn around Ireland's economic fortunes as well as primed the country for entry into the European Economic Community, later the European Union.

Fianna Fáil's fortunes began to falter in the 1970s and 1980s. In 1970 the Arms Crisis threatened to split the entire party in two when Fianna Fáil cabinet ministers Charles Haughey and Neil Blaney were dismissed by Jack Lynch after being accused of seeking to provide arms to the newly emergent Provisional Irish Republican Army. Factional infighting over Northern Ireland, economics and the "moral issues" such as the legalization of divorce, abortion, and contraception plagued the party in this era and grew particularly intense when Charles Haughey later became party leader. Under Haughey, Fianna Fáil lost both the 1981 general election and November 1982 general election to Garret FitzGerald's Fine Gael during a particularly chaotic time in Ireland's political and economic history. Numerous failed internal attempts to oust Haughey as leader of the party culminated in the most significant split in the party's history when a large portion of the membership walked out to create the Progressive Democrats in 1985, under the leadership of Haughey archrival Desmond O'Malley. Haughey was forced to resign as Taoiseach and party leader in 1992 following revelations about his role in a phone tapping scandal.

Although the two parties had seemed poised to be bitter enemies owing to the personal conflicts between the memberships, from 1989 onwards Fianna Fáil and the Progressive Democrats served repeatedly in coalition governments together, helping to stabilise Fianna Fáil. In 1994 Fianna Fáil came under the new leadership of Haughey protégé Bertie Ahern, who also became Taoiseach in 1997. Under Ahern, Fianna Fáil was able to claim credit for helping to broker the Good Friday Agreement in 1998 which began the peace process in Northern Ireland, as well the economic upswing caused by the Celtic Tiger which saw Ireland's economy boom during the 2000s. However, this momentum came to a sharp and sudden halt following two events. Firstly, Ahern was forced to resign as Taoiseach and left the party in 2008 following revelations made in the Mahon Tribunal that Ahern had accepted money from property developers. Secondly, the party, which was still in government under a new leader and Taoiseach Brian Cowen, was held responsible for the effects of the post-2008 Irish economic downturn. The party's popularity crashed: an opinion poll on 27 February 2009 indicated that only 10% of voters were satisfied with the Government's performance.

In the 2011 general election, it suffered the worst defeat of a sitting government in the history of the Irish state. This loss was described as "historic" in its proportions and "unthinkable". The party sank from being the largest in the Dáil to the third-largest, losing 58 of its 78 seats. This broke 79 consecutive years of Fianna Fáil being the largest single party in the Dáil. That election took place with Michael Martin as leader, as Cowen had resigned as party leader in January 2011, although retained his role as Taoiseach until the election. Cowen's premiership was sharply criticised in the media, with The Sunday Times describing Cowen's tenure as Taoiseach as "a dismal failure" and in 2011 the Irish Independent calling Cowen the "worst Taoiseach in the history of the State."

Recent history
Martin continued to lead Fianna Fáil past 2011; In the 2016 general election Martin's Fianna Fáil made a moderate recovery while Fine Gael retained control of the government as a minority government, made possible by a confidence and supply agreement with Fianna Fáíl. In 2018 the party was divided internally over how the party would handle that year's referendum on the Eighth Amendment, the provision in the Irish constitution which forbade abortion, with a significant portion of both the parliamentary party and the ordinary membership in favour of a No vote. Leader Michael Martin signalled his own desire for a Yes vote, but was unable to bring the party under one stance, and ultimately more than half of Fianna Fáil's TDs campaigned for a No vote. On polling day the Yes side won, 66% to 33%.

After the 2020 general election, for the first time in history, Fianna Fáil entered into a coalition government with its traditional rival Fine Gael, as well as the Green Party, with Fianna Fáil leader Micheál Martin serving as Taoiseach. That same year a number of Fianna Fáil members were involved in the "Golfgate" scandal, an event that ultimately led to the resignation of Fianna Fáil deputy leader Dara Calleary. In July 2021 Fianna Fáil suffered what a number of sources suggested might have been the single worst result in its history when the party polled extremely poorly in the 2021 Dublin Bay South by-election. The result prompted Jim O'Callaghan and Cathal Crowe to question whether Martin should lead the party into its next general election. In February 2023, former leader Bertie Ahern rejoined the party, having left in 2012.

Organisation and structure
Fianna Fáil uses a structure called a cumann system. The basic unit was the cumann (branch); these were grouped into comhairlí ceantair (district branches) and a comhairle dáil ceantair (constituency branch) in every constituency. The party claimed that in 2005 they had 50,000 registered names, but only an estimated 10,000–15,000 members were considered active.

However, from the early 1990s onward the cumann structure was weakened. Every cumann was entitled to three votes to selection conventions irrespective of its size; hence, a large number of cumainn had become in effect "paper cumainn", the only use of which was to ensure an aspiring or sitting candidate got enough votes. Although this phenomenon was nothing new (the most famous example being Neil Blaney's "Donegal Mafia").

Since the 2007 election, the party's structure has significantly weakened. This was in part exacerbated by significant infighting between candidates in the run-up to the 2011 general election. The Irish Times estimated that half of its 3,000 cumainn were effectively moribund. This fraction rose in Dublin with the exception of Dublin West, the former seat of both Brian Lenihan Snr and Brian Lenihan Jnr.

Ideology

In the modern era, Fianna Fáil is seen as a typical catch-all party and has defined itself as such. In the 1980s Brian Lenihan Snr declared "there are no isms or [ide]ologies in my party", while in the early 2000s Fianna Fáil leader Bertie Ahern affirmed the party's catch-all stance by defining Fianna Fáil as a party that "looks out for the small ranking guy, the middle-ranking guy and assists the big guy".  This contrasts with the more working-class orientation Fianna Fáil had in the early 20th century; In 1926 Seán Lemass described the party as "a progressive republican party based on the actual conditions of the moment" while upon winning the 1932 Irish general election, newly elected Fianna Fáil TD Seán Moylan proclaimed that Fianna Fáil's win meant a victory of "the owners of the donkey and cart over the pony and trap class". The Fianna Fáil party of the 1930s has been described as an economically social democratic one that sought to create an economically independent state (autarky) via protectionist policies, based on its culturally nationalist thinking.

During the leadership of Seán Lemass in the 1960s, Fianna Fáil began to utilise some corporatist policies (embracing the concept of ‘social partnership’), taking some influence from the Roman Catholic Church. It was also during Lemass' time that the party shifted heavily away from autarkic thinking and towards a firm belief in free trade and foreign direct investment in Ireland.

In 1967 Jack Lynch described the party as "left of centre" while suggesting it was to the left of Fine Gael and Labour. However, during the 1969 Irish general election the party ran red scare tactics against Labour after it began using the slogan "the seventies will be socialist!". As Fine Gael became more and more socially liberal in the 1970s under Garret FitzGerald, the party reacted by embracing social conservatism and populism. In the same time period, the emergence of the Troubles and the Arms Crisis of 1971 tested the party's nationalism, but despite these events, Fianna Fáil maintained their moderate culturally nationalist stance.

In the 1990s, Fianna Fáil was described as a conservative party but also as a nationalist party. It has presented itself as a "broad church" and attracted support from across disparate social classes. Between 1989 and 2011, it led coalition governments with parties of both the left and the right. Fianna Fáil's platform contains a number of enduring commitments: to Irish unity; to the promotion and protection of the Irish language; and to maintaining Ireland's tradition of military neutrality. While the party is distinctly more populist, nationalist, and generally more economically interventionist than Fine Gael, the party shares its rival's support of the European Union. Although part of the liberal ALDE group in the European Parliament, the party has not supported the group's positions on civil liberties and its liberal nature is disputed, though the party did legalize same-sex civil partnerships in 2010.

The party's name and logo incorporates the words 'The Republican Party'. According to Fianna Fáil, "Republican here stands both for the unity of the island and a commitment to the historic principles of European republican philosophy, namely liberty, equality and fraternity". The party's main goal at its beginning was to reunite the North and the South.

R. Ken Carty wrote of Fianna Fáil and Fine Gael that they were "heterogeneous in their bases of support, relatively undifferentiated in terms of policy or programme, and remarkably stable in their support levels". Evidence from expert surveys, opinion polls and candidate surveys all fail to identify strong distinctions between the two parties.

Leadership and president

The following are the terms of office as party leader and as Taoiseach:

Deputy leader

Seanad leader

Electoral results

Dáil Éireann

European Parliament

Front bench

Ógra Fianna Fáil

Ógra Fianna Fáil serves as the party's official youth wing.

Fianna Fáil and Northern Ireland politics
On 17 September 2007, Fianna Fáil announced that the party would for the first time organise in Northern Ireland. The then Foreign Minister Dermot Ahern was asked to chair a committee on the matter: "In the period ahead Dermot Ahern will lead efforts to develop that strategy for carrying through this policy, examining timescales and structures. We will act gradually and strategically. We are under no illusions. It will not be easy. It will challenge us all. But I am confident we will succeed".

The party embarked on its first ever recruitment drive north of the border in September 2007 in northern universities, and established two 'Political Societies', the William Drennan Cumann in Queens University, Belfast, and the Watty Graham Cumann in UU Magee, Derry, which subsequently became official units of Fianna Fáil's youth wing, attaining full membership and voting rights, and attained official voting delegates at the 2012 Ard Fheis. On 23 February 2008, it was announced that a former Ulster Unionist Party (UUP) councillor, Colonel Harvey Bicker, had joined Fianna Fáil.

Bertie Ahern announced on 7 December 2007 that Fianna Fáil had been registered in Northern Ireland by the UK Electoral Commission.
The party's Ard Fheis in 2009 unanimously passed a motion to organise in Northern Ireland by establishing forums, rather than cumainn, in each of its six counties. In December 2009, Fianna Fáil secured its first Northern Ireland Assembly MLA when Gerry McHugh, an independent MLA, announced he had joined the party. Mr. McHugh confirmed that although he had joined the party, he would continue to sit as an independent MLA. In June 2010, Fianna Fáil opened its first official office in Northern Ireland, in Crossmaglen, County Armagh. The then Taoiseach Brian Cowen officially opened the office, accompanied by Ministers Éamon Ó Cuív and Dermot Ahern and Deputies Rory O’Hanlon and Margaret Conlon. Discussing the party's slow development towards all-Ireland politics, Mr. Cowen observed: "We have a very open and pragmatic approach. We are a constitutional republican party and we make no secret of the aspirations on which this party was founded. It has always been very clear in our mind what it is we are seeking to achieve, that is to reconcile this country and not being prisoners of our past history. To be part of a generation that will build a new Ireland, an Ireland of which we can all be proud".

Fianna Fáil has not contested any elections in Northern Ireland since its registration and recognition there in 2007. At the party's 2014 Ard Fheis, a motion was passed without debate to stand candidates for election north of the border for the first time in 2019.

In 2017, Omagh councillor Sorcha McAnespy said she wished to run in the 2019 Northern Ireland local government election in the constituency under a Fianna Fáil ticket. In October 2017 she was elected as northern representative on the party's national executive, the "committee of 15".

Since 24 January 2019, the party have been in partnership with the Social Democratic and Labour Party (SDLP) formerly the main Irish nationalist party in Northern Ireland, but now smaller than Sinn Féin. There had long been speculation about the eventual partnership for several years prior. This was initially met with a negative reaction from Seamus Mallon, former Deputy Leader of the SDLP, who stated he would be opposed to any such merger. Former leader of the SDLP Margaret Ritchie originally stated publicly that she opposed any merger, announcing to the Labour Party Conference that such a merger would not happen on her "watch". On 10 January 2019, Richie stated that she now supported a new partnership with Fianna Fáil.

Both Fianna Fáil and the SDLP currently have shared policies on key areas including addressing the current political situation in Northern Ireland, improving public services in both jurisdictions of Ireland, such as healthcare, housing, education, and governmental reform, and bringing about the further unity and cooperation of the people on the island and arrangements for a future poll on Irish reunification.

In September 2022, SDLP party leader Colum Eastwood announced the end of its partnership with Fianna Fáil, saying that the SDLP needed to move forward by "standing on its own two feet".

Representation in European institutions
Fianna Fáil joined the Alliance of Liberals and Democrats for Europe (ALDE) party on 16 April 2009, and the party's Members of the European Parliament (MEPs) sat in the ALDE Group during the 7th European Parliament term from June 2009 to 1 July 2014. The party is a full member of the Liberal International. Prior to this, the party was part of the Eurosceptic Union for Europe of the Nations parliamentary group between 1999 and 2009.

Party headquarters, over the objections of some MEPs, had made several attempts to sever the party's links to the European right, including an aborted 2004 agreement to join the European Liberal Democrat and Reform (ELDR) Party, with whom it already sat in the Council of Europe under the Alliance of Liberals and Democrats for Europe (ALDE) banner. On 27 February 2009, Taoiseach Brian Cowen announced that Fianna Fáil proposed to join the ELDR Party and intended to sit with them in the Alliance of Liberals and Democrats for Europe (ALDE) Group in the European Parliament after the 2009 European elections.

In October 2009, it was reported that Fianna Fáil had irritated its new Liberal colleagues by failing to vote for the motion on press freedom in Italy (resulting in its defeat by a majority of one in the Parliament) and by trying to scupper their party colleagues' initiative for gay rights. In January 2010, a report by academic experts writing for the votewatch.eu site found that FF "do not seem to toe the political line" of the ALDE Group "when it comes to budget and civil liberties" issues.

In the 2014 European elections, Fianna Fáil received 22.3% of first-preference votes but only returned a single MEP, a reduction in representation of two MEPs from the previous term. This was due to a combination of the party's vote further dropping in Dublin and a two candidate strategy in the Midlands North West constituency, which backfired, resulting in sitting MEP Pat "the Cope" Gallagher losing his seat. On 23 June 2014, returning MEP Brian Crowley announced that he intended to sit with the European Conservatives and Reformists (ECR) rather than the ALDE group during the upcoming 8th term of the European parliament. The following day on 24 June 2014 Crowley had the Fianna Fáil party whip withdrawn. He has since been re-added to Fianna Fáil's website.

In the European Committee of the Regions, Fianna Fáil sits in the Renew Europe CoR group, with two full and two alternate members for the 2020–2025 mandate.  Kate Feeney is third vice-president of the Group and Group Coordinator in the SEDEC commission. Gillian Coughlan is Deputy Coordinator in the SEDEC Commission.

See also
Fianna Fáil politicians
List of political parties in Northern Ireland
List of political parties in the Republic of Ireland

Notes

References

Further reading

Joe Ambrose (2006) Dan Breen and the IRA, Douglas Village, Cork : Mercier Press, 223 p., 
Bruce Arnold (2001) Jack Lynch: Hero in Crisis, Dublin : Merlin, 250p.  
Tim Pat Coogan (1993) De Valera : long fellow, long shadow, London : Hutchinson, 772 p., 
Joe Joyce and Peter Murtagh (1983) The Boss: Charles J. Haughey in government, Swords, Dublin : Poolbeg Press, 400 p., 
Stephen Kelly (2013),Fianna Fáil, Partition and Northern Ireland, Kildare : Irish Academic Press 
 Stephen Kelly (2016), A failed political entity': Charles J. Haughey and the Northern Ireland question, 1945–1992, Kildare: Merrion Press 
F.S.L. Lyons (1985) Ireland Since the Famine, 2nd rev. ed., London : FontanaPress, 800 p., 
Dorothy McCardle (1968) The Irish Republic. A documented chronicle of the Anglo-Irish conflict and the partitioning of Ireland, with a detailed account of the period 1916–1923, etc., 989 p., 
Donnacha Ó Beacháin (2010) Destiny of the Soldiers: Fianna Fáil, Irish Republicanism and the IRA, 1926–1973, Gill and Macmillan, 540 p., 
T. Ryle Dwyer (2001) Nice fellow : a biography of Jack Lynch, Cork : Mercier Press, 416 p., 
T. Ryle Dwyer (1999) Short fellow : a biography of Charles J. Haughey, Dublin : Marino, 477 p., 
T. Ryle Dwyer, (1997) Fallen Idol : Haughey's controversial career, Cork : Mercier Press, 191 p., 
 Raymond Smith (1986) Haughey and O'Malley : The quest for power, Dublin : Aherlow, 295 p., 
Tim Ryan (1994) Albert Reynolds : the Longford leader : the unauthorised biography, Dublin : Blackwater Press, 226 p., 
Dick Walsh (1986) The Party: Inside Fianna Fáil, Dublin : Gill & Macmillan, 161 p.,

External links

  'Report of the Tribunal of Inquiry into the Beef Processing Industry'
 Report of the McCracken Tribunal
 Final report of the Mahon Tribunal

 
All-Ireland political parties
Alliance of Liberals and Democrats for Europe Party member parties
Christian democratic parties in Europe
Conservative parties in Ireland
Centrist parties in Europe
Irish republican parties
Parties represented in the European Parliament
Political parties established in 1926
Political parties in Northern Ireland
Political parties in the Republic of Ireland
Pro-European political parties in Ireland
1926 establishments in Ireland